Banin is the name of:

Mark Banin, television presenter
Tal Banin (born 1971), Israeli footballer
Umm ul-Banin (died 683), wife of Caliph Ali
Banine (1905–1992), French author

See also 
Banin, Idlib, a village in Syria